The 2022 West Lancashire Borough Council election took place on 5 May 2022 to elect members of West Lancashire Borough Council in Lancashire, England.

Results summary

Ward results

Ashurst

Aughton and Downholland

Aughton Park

Burscough East

Burscough West

Derby

Hesketh with Becconsall

Knowsley

Moorside

Newburgh

North Meols

Parbold

Scarisbrick

Scott

Skelmersdale South

Tanhouse

Tarleton

Up Holland

Wrightington

References

West Lancashire
West Lancashire Borough Council elections
2020s in Lancashire